Ronald Bix Plumstead (March 14, 1930 – March 17, 1993) was an American film and television character actor. He was best known for playing "Wally Plumstead" in the American sitcom television series The Adventures of Ozzie and Harriet from 1957 to 1966. Skip Young appeared as George Allison in Father Knows Best episode "Bud Lives it Up" in 1960.

Life and career 
Young was born in San Francisco, California. He began his career at the age of four, in which he appeared in the 1934 short film No More West, having to appear with Bert Lahr. Young later made his debut on television in 1952, after spending eight years acting on radio. In 1957, he won the role of Wally Plumstead, Rick's fraternity brother and best friend,  on The Adventures of Ozzie and Harriet, and remained on the show through its final season in 1966.

Ozzie Nelson hired Plumstead for the role of Wally after seeing him perform in "McDonald's Farm" at Knott's Berry Farm in Buena Park, California. Ozzie and Harriet's "Wally" was "Chubby" until Plumstead, Young's original surname, was added to "Wally".

After the series ended, Young guest-starred in television programs including Green Acres, Custer, Adam-12, Starsky & Hutch and Growing Pains. He also appeared and co-starred in films such as A Cold Wind in August, WUSA and Lobster Man from Mars. In 1973, Young moved to Apple Valley, California, where he lived near his only daughter. He spent the rest of his life, as a radio personality on a radio talk show. He was also a judge of beauty pageants and cook-offs, participating in numerous community events.

Death 
Young died in March 1993 of natural causes, in which he also had complications of diabetes and a heart disease, at his home in Apple Valley, California, at the age of 63. He was buried in Riverside National Cemetery.

References

External links 

Rotten Tomatoes profile

1930 births
1993 deaths
People from San Francisco
Male actors from San Francisco
Deaths from diabetes
American male film actors
American male television actors
American male radio actors
20th-century American male actors
Burials at Riverside National Cemetery